The 2021 Reading Council election took place in 2021 to elect members of Reading Borough Council. This was on the same day as other local elections. The election was originally due to take place in May 2020, but was postponed due to the COVID-19 pandemic.

Council elections for the Reading Borough Council were last held on 2 May 2019 as part of the 2019 United Kingdom local elections. The council will undergo a major boundary revision to apply from the 2022 elections.

All locally registered electors (British, Irish, Commonwealth and European Union citizens) who are aged 18 or over on polling day are entitled to vote in the local elections.

Results summary

Ward Results

Abbey

Battle

Caversham

Church

Katesgrove

Kentwood

Mapledurham

Minster

Norcot

Park

Peppard

Redlands

Southcote

Thames

Tilehurst

Whitley

References

Reading
2021
2020s in Berkshire
May 2021 events in the United Kingdom